"The Good Life" (originally "La Belle Vie" in French) is a song by Sacha Distel with French lyrics by Jean Broussolle, published in 1962. It was featured in the movie The Seven Deadly Sins.

Billy Eckstine: "Now Singing In 12 Great Movies" is a 1963 studio album. It was arranged by Billy Byers, conducted by Bobby Tucker, and produced by Quincy Jones.

Tony Bennett recording
The song is best known in the English-speaking world via a 1963 recording by Tony Bennett with English lyrics by Jack Reardon. In the US, it was a number 18 hit on the U.S. pop singles chart, and number 7 on the Middle-Road Singles chart. Outside the US, "The Good Life" rose  to number 27 on the UK Singles Chart. 
"The Good Life" became one of Bennett's staple songs, and was featured on four of his top-selling albums, including 1994's MTV Unplugged: Tony Bennett and 2006's Duets: An American Classic, the latter featuring Billy Joel.  Bennett also named his 1998 autobiography after the song. He continued to perform the song live and did so at his final concerts, at Radio City Music Hall, aged 95.

Chart performance

Other recorded versions
A version recorded by Tony Orlando was subsequently released on Bell Records.
In 1973, the song was released by Julius La Rosa as a single 45 record on vinyl, with "Save Me a Song" on side B, on RCA's Victor label. It became a hit at Metromedia radio station WNEW, 1130 on the AM dial, in New York City. And Julius La Rosa was also a disc jockey there, playing his own song. This version of the song had slightly altered lyrics. Uniquely arranged and conducted by Hal Massimino, the biggest change was in the main lyric, where "goodbye" was replaced with "hello."
The Drifters (1965)
Sacha Distel and Dionne Warwick (2004)

Popular culture
The Tony Orlando recording, was used as the theme song of the short-lived sitcom of the same name, starring Larry Hagman.
In 1991, a version of the song, sung by Ray Charles, appeared in the film Nothing but Trouble, starring Chevy Chase, Demi Moore, Dan Aykroyd and John Candy. Charles' version was subsequently released on the film's soundtrack in 1991 through Warner Bros. Records.
"The Good Life" was the theme song of the 2000 British gangster film, Gangster No. 1.
The Tony Bennett version also features in the 1988 British feature film Buster, about the criminals responsible for the 1963 Great Train Robbery in Buckinghamshire. 
The song was also employed as a 2007 jingle for a line of pet foods of the same name. 
A Julie London rendition was used by British Airways in its 2008 promotion of the new London Heathrow Terminal 5 facility.
A rendition by The Divine Comedy was used in a 2022 advert for Magnum ice cream.

Certifications

References

1962 songs
1963 singles
1973 singles
Tony Bennett songs
Dionne Warwick songs